Novodobrinka is a rural locality (a khutor) in Moretskoye Rural Settlement, Yelansky District, Volgograd Oblast, Russia. The population was 107 as of 2010.

Geography 
Novodobrinka is located on Khopyorsko-Buzulukskaya Plain, on the left bank of the Egorovka River, 39 km northeast of Yelan (the district's administrative centre) by road. Khvoshchinka is the nearest rural locality.

References 

Rural localities in Yelansky District